Three Star Wars films were adapted into manga by MediaWorks between 1997 and 1999: A New Hope (1977), The Empire Strikes Back (1980), and Return of the Jedi (1983). Later Shogakukan adapted The Phantom Menace (1999) into manga too. They were published in English by Dark Horse Comics.

Volumes 
In the English versions the art was copied in mirror-image in order to be read from left to right and the content was split into more volumes than the Japanese edition.

A New Hope

Artwork – Hisao Tamaki
Volumes – 4
Volume 1: Luke meeting Obi-wan and the droids, destruction of Luke's home
Volume 2: Meeting of Han Solo, journey to Death Star
Volume 3: Death Star events, Obi-wan's death
Volume 4: Attack of Death Star

The Empire Strikes Back

Artwork – Toshiki Kudo
Volumes – 4
Volume 1: Hoth Battle
Volume 2: Meeting Yoda
Volume 3: Han, Leia, Chewbacca, C3P-O on Cloud City
Volume 4: Han frozen, Luke loses his hand to Vader

Return of the Jedi

Artwork – Shin'ichi Hiromoto
Volumes – 4
Volume 1: Everyone captured by Jabba
Volume 2: Escape from Jabba, head to Dagobah
Volume 3: Ewok village, Luke's capture
Volume 4: Death of Vader and Palpatine

The Phantom Menace

Artwork – Kia Asamiya
Volumes – 2
Volume 1: Finding of Anakin
Volume 2: Qui-Gon's death and Darth Maul battle

References

External links

Animerica review of A New Hope
Animerica review of The Phantom Menace

Comics based on Star Wars
Children's manga
Dark Horse Comics titles
Space opera anime and manga
Eisner Award winners
Harvey Award winners
Extraterrestrials in anime and manga